The third election to Fife Regional Council was held on 6 May 1982 as part of the wider 1982 Scottish regional elections. The election saw Labour maintaining their control of the region's 46-seat council.

Aggregate results

References

Fife
1982
May 1982 events in the United Kingdom